In Greek mythology, Harmonia (/harmoˈnia/, "harmony", "agreement") is the immortal goddess of harmony and concord. Her Roman counterpart is Concordia. Her Greek opposite is Eris, whose Roman counterpart is Discordia.

Family

According to one account, she is the daughter of Ares and Aphrodite. By another account, Harmonia was from Samothrace and was the daughter of Zeus and Electra, her brother Iasion being the founder of the mystic rites celebrated on the island.

Almost always, Harmonia is the wife of Cadmus. With Cadmus, she was the mother of Ino, Polydorus, Autonoë, Agave, and Semele. Their youngest son was Illyrius.

Mythology 

Those who described Harmonia as a Samothracian related that Cadmus, on his voyage to Samothrace, after being initiated in the mysteries, perceived Harmonia and carried her off with the assistance of Athena. When Cadmus was obliged to quit Thebes, Harmonia accompanied him. When they came to the Enchelii, they assisted them in their war against the Illyrians, and conquered the enemy. Cadmus then became king of the Illyrians, but afterwards he was turned into a serpent. Harmonia, in her grief stripped herself, then begged Cadmus to come to her.  As she was embraced by the serpent Cadmus in a pool of wine, the gods then turned her into a serpent, unable to stand watching her in her dazed state.

The cursed necklace

Harmonia is renowned in ancient story chiefly on account of the fatal necklace she received on her wedding day. When the government of Thebes was bestowed upon Cadmus by Athena, Zeus gave him Harmonia. All the gods honored the wedding with their presence. Cadmus presented the bride with a robe and necklace, which he had received either from Hephaestus or from Europa. This necklace, commonly referred to as the necklace of Harmonia, brought misfortune to all who possessed it. Other traditions stated that Harmonia received this necklace (ὅρμος) from some of the gods, either from Aphrodite or Athena.

Polynices, who inherited the necklace, gave it to Eriphyle, that she might persuade her husband, Amphiaraus, to undertake the expedition against Thebes. Through Alcmaeon, the son of Eriphyle, the necklace came into the hands of Arsinoe (named Alphesiboea in some versions), next into those of the sons of Phegeus, Pronous and Agenor, and lastly into those of the sons of Alcmaeon, Amphoterus and Acarnan, who dedicated it in the temple of Athena Pronoea at Delphi. The necklace had wrought mischief to all who had been in possession of it, and it continued to do so even after it was dedicated at Delphi. Phayllus, the tyrant, stole it from the temple to gratify his mistress, the wife of Ariston. She wore it for a time, but at last her youngest son was seized with madness, and set fire to the house, in which she perished with all her treasures.

Hyginus gives another version. According to him, the thing which brought ill fate to the descendants of Harmonia is not a necklace, but a robe "dipped in crime", given to Harmonia by Hephestus and Hera. The necklace gave peace and held Harmonia's powers in it, which is what made it cursed.

See also 
 Aneris
 Cadmus et Hermione
 Eris
 Homonoia, goddess of concord, unanimity, and oneness of mind

Notes

References 
 Apollodorus, The Library with an English Translation by Sir James George Frazer, F.B.A., F.R.S. in 2 Volumes, Cambridge, MA, Harvard University Press; London, William Heinemann Ltd. 1921. ISBN 0-674-99135-4. Online version at the Perseus Digital Library. Greek text available from the same website.
Apollonius Rhodius, Argonautica translated by Robert Cooper Seaton (1853-1915), R. C. Loeb Classical Library Volume 001. London, William Heinemann Ltd, 1912. Online version at the Topos Text Project.
Apollonius Rhodius, Argonautica. George W. Mooney. London. Longmans, Green. 1912. Greek text available at the Perseus Digital Library.
Athenaeus of Naucratis, The Deipnosophists or Banquet of the Learned. London. Henry G. Bohn, York Street, Covent Garden. 1854. Online version at the Perseus Digital Library.
Athenaeus of Naucratis, Deipnosophistae. Kaibel. In Aedibus B.G. Teubneri. Lipsiae. 1887. Greek text available at the Perseus Digital Library.

Diodorus Siculus, The Library of History translated by Charles Henry Oldfather. Twelve volumes. Loeb Classical Library. Cambridge, Massachusetts: Harvard University Press; London: William Heinemann, Ltd. 1989. Vol. 3. Books 4.59–8. Online version at Bill Thayer's Web Site
Diodorus Siculus, Bibliotheca Historica. Vol 1-2. Immanel Bekker. Ludwig Dindorf. Friedrich Vogel. in aedibus B. G. Teubneri. Leipzig. 1888-1890. Greek text available at the Perseus Digital Library.
Euripides, The Tragedies of Euripides translated by T. A. Buckley. Bacchae. London. Henry G. Bohn. 1850. Online version at the Perseus Digital Library.
Euripides, Euripidis Fabulae. vol. 3. Gilbert Murray. Oxford. Clarendon Press, Oxford. 1913. Greek text available at the Perseus Digital Library.
Gaius Julius Hyginus, Fabulae from The Myths of Hyginus translated and edited by Mary Grant. University of Kansas Publications in Humanistic Studies. Online version at the Topos Text Project.
Hesiod, Theogony from The Homeric Hymns and Homerica with an English Translation by Hugh G. Evelyn-White, Cambridge, MA.,Harvard University Press; London, William Heinemann Ltd. 1914. Online version at the Perseus Digital Library. Greek text available from the same website.
The Homeric Hymns and Homerica with an English Translation by Hugh G. Evelyn-White. Homeric Hymns. Cambridge, MA.,Harvard University Press; London, William Heinemann Ltd. 1914. Online version at the Perseus Digital Library. Greek text available from the same website.
Parthenius, Love Romances translated by Sir Stephen Gaselee (1882-1943), S. Loeb Classical Library Volume 69. Cambridge, MA. Harvard University Press. 1916.  Online version at the Topos Text Project.
Parthenius, Erotici Scriptores Graeci, Vol. 1. Rudolf Hercher. in aedibus B. G. Teubneri. Leipzig. 1858. Greek text available at the Perseus Digital Library.
Pindar, Odes translated by Diane Arnson Svarlien. 1990. Online version at the Perseus Digital Library.
Pindar, The Odes of Pindar including the Principal Fragments with an Introduction and an English Translation by Sir John Sandys, Litt.D., FBA. Cambridge, MA., Harvard University Press; London, William Heinemann Ltd. 1937. Greek text available at the Perseus Digital Library.
Publius Ovidius Naso, Metamorphoses translated by Brookes More (1859-1942). Boston, Cornhill Publishing Co. 1922. Online version at the Perseus Digital Library.
Publius Ovidius Naso, Metamorphoses. Hugo Magnus. Gotha (Germany). Friedr. Andr. Perthes. 1892. Latin text available at the Perseus Digital Library.
Publius Papinius Statius, The Thebaid translated by John Henry Mozley. Loeb Classical Library Volumes. Cambridge, MA, Harvard University Press; London, William Heinemann Ltd. 1928. Online version at the Topos Text Project.
Publius Papinius Statius, The Thebaid. Vol I-II. John Henry Mozley. London: William Heinemann; New York: G.P. Putnam's Sons. 1928. Latin text available at the Perseus Digital Library.

External links 

Greek goddesses
Peace goddesses
Personifications in Greek mythology
Children of Aphrodite
Children of Ares
Metamorphoses into animals in Greek mythology
Theban mythology
Deeds of Zeus